In 1880, Serbian Major Kosta "Koka" Milovanović (Коста "Кока" Миловановић) developed an updated version of the Mauser Model 1871, still single-shot, but chambered in its unique 10.15×63R caliber. It had unique additions in that it had a bolt guide (much like the M1870 Italian Vetterli) and the "progressive rifling" that was developed by Koka. The Kingdom of Serbia adopted the rifle in 1880. It was designated Serbian Model 1878/80, also known as Mauser-Koka, Mauser-Milovanović, and known in Serbian as Kokinka (Кокинка). The grooves reduced in diameter from breech to muzzle. It saw first combat in the Serbo-Bulgarian War. Approximately 110,000 Mauser-Milovanović rifles entered the Serbian arsenal. It was further developed in 1907.

Mauser-Koka 1884
The Mauser Model 1884 "Artillery Carbine" was produced in 1884 in 4,000 units at the Oberndorf plant for the use of the Serbian cavalry. It was based on the M71/84 and had a five-round tubular magazine.  In the late 1930s, all remaining Model 1884 carbines were converted to the 1870s vintage 13.78mm "LAK" cartridge, which was in good supply in Yugoslav Army depots.

Mauser-Koka-Đurić
Starting 1907, about half of the Mauser-Koka inventory was converted in Kragujevac to shoot the 7×57mm from a 5-shot magazine; the new barrels were purchased from Steyr. Both the old and new guns (designated M80/07) saw action in the Balkan Wars and World War I. The converted M80/07 are often referred to as "Đurić Mausers" (Ђурић-Маузер). The M80/07 C rifles captured from the Royal Yugoslav Army by the Nazi Germany during the World War II were designated Gewehr 223 (j).

See also

Serbian Model 1899
Serbian Model 1908
Serbian Model 1910
Yugoslavian Model 90
Yugoslavian Model 03
Yugoslavian Model 24
Yugoslavian Model 24CK
Yugoslavian Model 24 Carbine

References

Sources

John Sheehan, 1 of 110,000. The Serbian M78/80 is one of the Rarest of Mauser Rifles", Guns magazine, May 2012, pp. 36-39

Rifles of Serbia
Royal Serbian Army
Mauser rifles
Zastava Arms
1880s establishments in Serbia
World War I Serbian infantry weapons
Single-shot rifles